Royal Air Force Stanmore Park or more simply RAF Stanmore Park is a former Royal Air Force station in Stanmore, Middlesex (now the London Borough of Harrow).

History
The unit was opened in 1939 and closed in 1997. In 1939 RAF Balloon Command was established at Stanmore Park.
The unit was built on the grounds of Stanmore Hall that was purchased by the Air Ministry in 1938 and the hall was demolished during the station development programme.

RAF Stanmore Park formed part of No 11 Group, which was originally at RAF Uxbridge and then transferred to nearby RAF Bentley Priory until its closure.  The station closed in April 1997, with housing built on much of the site. One building was retained for the use of 2236 Air Training Corps The building currently in use is the converted / extended NAAFI building which was between the Married Quarters and Junior Ranks Mess. The Community Centre now houses Army Youth Services, Nursery School, a Mums and Tots group and 2236 ATC Sqn. A number of activities now take place at the centre when not in use by these organisations.

See also
List of former Royal Air Force stations

References

External links

 http://www.battle-of-britain.com/BoB2/local_defences/AAA/aaa.htm
 2236 (Stanmore) Squadron, Air Training Corps

Stanmore Park
History of the London Borough of Harrow
Military installations established in 1939
Military installations closed in 1997
Stanmore Park
Stanmore